Jacob Astley may refer to:

Jacob Astley, 1st Baron Astley of Reading (1579–1652), English soldier and royalist
Sir Jacob Astley, 1st Baronet (c. 1639–1729), English MP for Norfolk
Sir Jacob Astley, 5th Baronet (1756–1817), English landowner and Member of Parliament
Jacob Astley, 3rd Baron Astley of Reading (c. 1654–1688), English peer
Jacob Astley, 16th Baron Hastings (1797–1859), British MP for West Norfolk